Ruthie Gilor is a lawn and indoor international bowler.

Bowls career
Gilor represented Israel during the 2000 World Outdoor Bowls Championship and 2004 World Outdoor Bowls Championship (in which she reached the singles quarter final) and the 2012 World Outdoor Bowls Championship. In 2005 she became the first person to reach all four disciplines in the Israeli National championships and successfully defended her singles crown winning of the third time.

In 2007, she won the singles silver medal and bronze pairs medal at the Atlantic Bowls Championships.

In 2009, she won the singles gold medal at the Atlantic Bowls Championships In 2011, she won a bronze medal at the European Bowls Championships in Portugal.

In 2019, ten years after her last Atlantic medal she won the singles gold again at the 2019 Atlantic Bowls Championships. In 2020, was selected for the 2020 World Outdoor Bowls Championship.

References

Living people
1965 births
Place of birth missing (living people)
Israeli female bowls players